The lambrequin arch, also known as (or related to) the muqarnas arch, is a type of arch with an ornate profile of lobes and points. It is especially characteristic of Moorish and Moroccan architecture.

The "muqarnas arch" is both another name for this type of arch as well as a more specific type of arch whose intrados (inner surfaces) are made up of muqarnas sculpting, which has a very close resemblance to the lambrequin arch. Some scholars speculate that the lambrequin arch was itself derived from the use of muqarnas in archways. Moreover, lambrequin arches were indeed commonly used with muqarnas sculpting along the intrados of the arch. Its origins are also traced further back to the "mixtilinear" arches seen in the oratory of the 11th-century Aljaferia Palace in Zaragoza.

This type of arch was introduced into the Maghreb and Al-Andalus regions during the Almoravid period (11th-12th centuries), with an early appearance in the funerary section of the Qarawiyyin Mosque (in Fez) dating from the early 12th century. It then became common in subsequent Almohad, Marinid, and Nasrid architecture, in many cases used to highlight the arches near the mihrab area of a mosque. Muqarnas arches are also found abundantly the Alhambra palaces in Granada, for example, particularly the Court of Lions.

See also 

 Horseshoe arch
 Multifoil arch

References 

Islamic architectural elements
Moorish architecture
Architecture in Spain
Architectural elements
Architecture in Morocco